, also known as TUY, is a television network headquartered in Yamagata Prefecture, Japan.  TUY is the third commercial television broadcaster in Yamagata Prefecture, it was started broadcasting in 1989. TUY is affiliated with JNN. TBS Holdings is the biggest shareholder of TUY, hold 18% of TUY's stock share.

In December 2005, TUY started broadcasting digital terrestrial television.

References

External links
 Official website 

Companies based in Yamagata Prefecture
Television stations in Japan
Japan News Network
Television channels and stations established in 1988